Oleg Alekseevich Zaytsev (b. August 4, 1939 in Moscow, Soviet Union - d. March 1, 1993) was an ice hockey defenceman who played in the Soviet Hockey League. He played for HC CSKA Moscow. He was inducted into the Russian and Soviet Hockey Hall of Fame in 1966.

He won two Olympic gold medals competing for the Soviet Union hockey team in 1964 and 1968.

References

External links

Russian and Soviet Hockey Hall of Fame bio

1939 births
1993 deaths
HC CSKA Moscow players
Ice hockey people from Moscow
Ice hockey players at the 1964 Winter Olympics
Ice hockey players at the 1968 Winter Olympics
Medalists at the 1964 Winter Olympics
Olympic gold medalists for the Soviet Union
Olympic ice hockey players of the Soviet Union
Olympic medalists in ice hockey
Soviet ice hockey defencemen